
Gmina Kcynia is an urban-rural gmina (administrative district) in Nakło County, Kuyavian-Pomeranian Voivodeship, in north-central Poland.

Villages
Apart from the town of Kcynia, Gmina Kcynia contains the villages and settlements of: 
 
 Bąk
 Chwaliszewo
 Dębogóra
 Dobieszewko
 Dobieszewo
 Dziewierzewo
 Elizewo
 Głogowiniec
 Górki Dąbskie
 Górki Zagajne
 Grocholin
 Gromadno
 Iwno
 Józefkowo
 Karmelita
 Karolinowo
 Kazimierzewo
 Kowalewko
 Kowalewko-Folwark
 Krzepiszyn
 Łankowice
 Laskownica
 Ludwikowo
 Malice
 Miaskowo
 Miastowice
 Mieczkowo
 Mycielowo
 Nowa Wieś Notecka
 Palmierowo
 Paulina
 Piotrowo
 Rozpętek
 Rozstrzębowo
 Sierniki
 Sipiory
 Słupowa
 Słupowiec
 Smogulecka Wieś
 Stalówka
 Studzienki
 Suchoręcz
 Suchoręczek
 Szczepice
 Tupadły
 Turzyn
 Ujazd
 Weronika
 Włodzimierzewo
 Zabłocie
 Żarczyn 
 Żurawia

Neighbouring gminas
Gmina Kcynia is bordered by the gminas of Gołańcz, Nakło nad Notecią, Sadki, Szubin, Wapno, Wyrzysk and Żnin.

References
Polish official population figures 2006

Kcynia
Nakło County